Hainanpotamon vietnamicum is a species of crab. Originally described as a species of Geothelphusa, it is now treated as part of the genus Hainanpotamon, although it has also been suggested as a member of Tiwaripotamon. It is only known from a single locality in Cúc Phương National Park, Ninh Bình Province, Vietnam.

References

Potamoidea
Freshwater crustaceans of Asia
Arthropods of Vietnam
Endemic fauna of Vietnam
Crustaceans described in 2002
Taxobox binomials not recognized by IUCN